Metal Circus is an EP by American punk rock band Hüsker Dü, released in 1983 by SST Records. As one of their early records, it was largely rooted in the band's initial hardcore punk style. However, signs of a new, poppier influence emerge on Metal Circus, particularly in the songs sung by Grant Hart ("It's Not Funny Anymore" and "Diane"). It also features some of Bob Mould's most passionate singing and shows further development in his guitar playing. Harmonic, chorus-type effects applied to Mould's guitar are more prominent.  The change from the furious hardcore moments of Land Speed Record and Everything Falls Apart towards increasing melodicism hints at the groundbreaking new approach that was to be seen on the band's next release, Zen Arcade.

The horrific murder depicted in the anguished "Diane" is based upon the murder of West St. Paul waitress Diane Edwards by Joseph Ture in 1980. The song was covered by Coffin Break in 1989, Irish band Therapy? in 1995, Superdrag in 1998 and Gravenhurst in 2004 .

While only 21 seconds shorter than their debut studio album Everything Falls Apart, and generally viewed as an EP, Metal Circus was almost released as a 30-minute album with 12 songs. The outtakes were "Standing by the Sea" (later used on Zen Arcade), "Heavy Handed", "Is Today the Day?", "You Think I'm Scared", and "Won't Change" (which later appeared on the compilation A Diamond Hidden in the Mouth of a Corpse). In 2017, The Numero Group released the Savage Young Dü compilation of early Hüsker Dü material. A bonus edition of the compilation was packaged with a 7" entitled Extra Circus containing the outtakes from the EP's sessions.

Critical reception

In a 1984 Trouser Press review, John Leland said the band "flirts with heavy metal, but also reveal strains of folk and psychedelia. The metal ventures (noisy lead guitars) expand Hüsker Dü's sound without getting sludgy or bombastic. On the slower tunes,...the guitars drone like a supercharged Dream Syndicate. On the fast tunes they smoke." 

AllMusic's Stephen Thomas Erlewine said that Metal Circus "is the first indication of Hüsker Dü's greatness," adding that "With these five songs, the band shows more invention, skill, and melody than it did over the course of a full album with Everything Falls Apart, and both Bob Mould and Grant Hart emerge as significant songwriters."

Track listing
Side One
 "Real World" (Mould) – 2:27
 "Deadly Skies" (Mould) – 1:50
 "It's Not Funny Anymore" (Hart) – 2:12
 "First of the Last Calls" (Mould) – 2:48
Side Two
 "Lifeline" (Mould) – 2:19
 "Diane" (Hart) – 4:42
 "Out on a Limb" (Mould) – 2:39

Personnel
Liner notes adapted from the album sleeve.

Hüsker Dü
Bob Mould – vocals, guitar
Grant Hart – vocals, drums
Greg Norton – bass guitar
 Technical
 Hüsker Dü – producer
 Spot – producer, engineer
Fake Name Graphx – album cover

References

1983 EPs
Hüsker Dü albums
Albums produced by Bob Mould
SST Records EPs